Stereotypes of British people are found in several cultures. Some stereotypes relate to specific ethnic groups of Britain while others are directed at British nationals in general.

Common stereotypes

Politeness
Both historically and in the present day, the British have often been associated with good manners by many people around the world, similar to Canadians.

Humour
British humour is well known for its use of sarcasm, dark comedy, and irony. Monty Python was a famous British comedic group and some of the most highly regarded comedies, such as Fawlty Towers and Mr. Bean, are British.

Tea 

Drinking tea - specifically the more oxidised black tea - is seen as a key part of British culture. Originally introduced as a luxury product in the 17th century, cheap imports from colonial India allowed its consumption to significantly increase during the second half of the 19th century.

Today it remains a popular beverage, with surveys from 2017 showing that the UK had the 12th largest tea consumption per capita in the world, and that almost 75% of British people who drank tea daily had at least two cups a day.

Other hot drinks, especially coffee, are also popular.

Lack of emotion
The British are often seen as reserved and unemotional. This perspective has been bolstered by popular British phrases such as "stiff upper lip", which means displaying an emotionless and determined exterior in the face of hardship; "keep calm and carry on", which was taken from a motivational poster produced by the UK government in preparation for World War II; and "always look on the bright side of life", which was lifted from a popular Monty Python comedy song about persevering in the direst situations.

Teeth
Americans often joke about the British having bad teeth. This stereotype appears to stem from a particularly American view of dental health in which artificially straightened and whitened teeth (sometimes referred to as "Hollywood teeth") are the healthiest, but this primarily affects only the outer appearance of teeth and some evidence has shown that artificial whitening actually has a negative effect on dental health. In reality, British teeth have been ranked as the fifth healthiest in the world, with American teeth behind in ninth place.

Jokes about British teeth appear in American popular culture. In The Simpsons episode "Last Exit to Springfield", a strict dentist scares Ralph Wiggum into brushing his teeth by showing him a fictional book titled The Big Book of British Smiles that depicts a King’s Guard member and King Charles III with exaggeratedly crooked teeth. A Rimmel cosmetics television advertisement featuring Georgia May Jagger became an internet meme in 2014. In the advertisement, Jagger says "get the London look" and viewers ultimately associated the "London look" with the gap between her front teeth.

Food
Jokes are often told about British food being either poor quality or inedible. Historically, British cuisine was generally fairly bland after the World War II period, but globalisation and mass immigration have caused it to become more diverse.

Monolingualism
There is a common stereotype that the British are only able to speak English. This has some truth to it, as (like in many English-speaking countries) levels of bilingualism are relatively low. Additionally, the number of people who speak a language other than English as their first language is reasonably low, especially among those who were born in the UKeven among those with immediate immigrant ancestry. However, most British schoolchildren receive at least a few years of compulsory French, German or Spanish lessons. This used to happen during the first years of secondary school, but teaching foreign languages at an earlier age has been viewed as increasingly important.

Anti-social behaviour abroad
In some tourist-heavy European countries such as Cyprus, Greece, and Spain, British holidaymakers are closely associated with anti-social and violent behaviour, usually related to binge drinking. Similar to Americans, British tourists have also been stereotyped as preferring to shout and talk slower in English when interacting with foreigners instead of making an effort to use the local language (see "monolingualism" above).

Weather
British weather is often associated with rain and fog. British people are often stereotyped for frequently discussing the weather.

Football hooliganism
Football hooliganism has a worldwide association with Britain; so much so that it is often dubbed the British of English disease. In 1985, Prime Minister Margaret Thatcher established a "war cabinet" to combat football hooliganism.. Football hooliganism has been linked to such events such as the Heysel Stadium disaster and the Hillsborough disaster. However, the British government has led a widespread crackdown on football related violence since the 1980s, and British football fans now have a better reputation abroad.

References

British
British culture
Cultural depictions of British people
Society of the United Kingdom